The Ecologist Radical Intransigent Party (acronym PERI) is a Uruguayan green party established in 2013.

It participated in 2014 and 2019 primaries and general elections, obtaining in 2019 for the first time a seat in the Deputy chamber.

The party runs its own broadcasting programme on CX 40 Radio Fénix, La voz del agro.

History

2014 elections 
PERI obtained  votes in the 2014 Uruguayan presidential primaries held on 1 June 2014, enough votes to gain the right to participate in the 2014 Uruguayan general election. One of its goals for October 2014 campaign was to install the environmental and ecological agenda in the Uruguayan Parliament.

After the final scrutiny of the October general elections by the Electoral Court of Uruguay, PERI obtained  votes. After one year since its creation, it almost reached a seat in the Deputy Chamber in 2014.

2019 elections 
After the final counts of the general election of October by the Electoral Court of Uruguay, PERI obtained  votes (with the total of circuits scrutinized), therefore Cesar Vega was elected as the sole deputy for PERI to the lower chamber.

Electoral history

Presidential elections

Chamber of Deputies and Senate elections

Gallery

References

External links 
 
 

Green political parties in Uruguay
Green liberalism
2013 establishments in Uruguay
Political parties established in 2013
Environment of Uruguay